The Winchester Football Club was an English football team based in Winchester, Hampshire.

History
Winchester Football Club were formed in 1884.  They reached the final of the inaugural Hampshire Senior Cup competition in 1888.
However financial difficulties led to the 1884 club folding in 1893.

Another Winchester club, Winchester Swallows F.C. changed their name to Winchester F. C. in 1894. It was this club that became Winchester City F.C. in 1907.

Club Honours

Cup honours
Hampshire Senior Cup
 Runners Up: 1887–88

Defunct football clubs in Hampshire
Sport in Winchester
Association football clubs established in 1884
Defunct football clubs in England
1884 establishments in England
Association football clubs disestablished in 1893